In a film crew, there are two kinds of best boy:  best boy electric and best boy grip. They are assistants to their department heads, the gaffer (in charge of electricals) and the key grip (lighting and rigging), respectively. In short, the best boy acts as the foreman for the department. A woman who performs these duties may be called best girl.

Job responsibilities
Best boys are responsible for the day-to-day operation of the lighting or grip department. Their many responsibilities include the hiring, scheduling, and management of crew; the renting, ordering, inventory, and returning of equipment; workplace safety and maintaining discipline within their department; completing timecards and other paperwork; stocking of expendables; loading and unloading production trucks; planning and implementing the lighting or rigging of locations and/or sound stages; coordinating with rigging crews and additional photography units (if applicable); handling relations with the other production departments; overseeing the application of union rules (where relevant); and serving as the day-to-day representative of the department with the unit production manager and coordinator of their department.

The best boy also commonly accompanies or stands in for the key grip or gaffer during technical scouts. During shooting, the best boy may also cover for the key grip or gaffer when he or she is on a break or otherwise away from the set.

On films with very small crews, the electricals (lighting) department often consists of only a gaffer, a best boy, and a few electricians. The grip department may include only a key grip, a best boy, and a few grips. Large-scale productions such as major films commonly include full-time rigging and second unit crews, and in total may hire many dozens of grips or electricians at one time.

Etymology
It is unclear why this term came to be used as a job title on film sets. According to the OED, "It has been suggested that it originated as a term for a master's most able apprentice, or alternatively that it was transferred from earlier use for a member of a ship's crew, but confirmatory evidence for either of these theories appears to be lacking." The earliest known appearance of the phrase in print is 1931 from the Albuquerque Journal: "Among the electricians ... the department head is the gaffer, his first assistant is the best boy."

As the gaffer is sometimes credited as the chief lighting technician, the best boy electric is sometimes credited as the "assistant chief lighting technician".

The title is accepted for use in credits by the BBC.

The end credits of the 1982 comedy film Airplane II: The Sequel named the Best Boy, then the next line was "Worst Boy", naming Adolf Hitler in that position.

Usage outside English
Many French language films made in Canada use Best Boy in the credits. The term has been known to appear in the credits of some French films made in France, but it has not been known to appear in Belgian or Swiss films.

The German film Auf der anderen Seite (The Edge of Heaven), which takes place in Germany and Turkey, uses the term Best Boy in its German credits. German TV and film crews regularly use the term, because no equivalent phrase exists in German.

In Icelandic movie credits, a best boy is occasionally called besti drengurinn ("the best boy").

References

Filmmaking occupations